Rick Leach and Jim Pugh were the defending champions but only Leach competed that year with Laurie Warder.

Leach and Warder lost in the quarterfinals to Pieter Aldrich and Danie Visser.

Ken Flach and Robert Seguso won in the final 6–4, 6–4 against Aldrich and Visser.

Seeds

Draw

Final

Top half

Bottom half

External links
 1989 Cincinnati Open Doubles Draw

1989 Grand Prix (tennis)